The Mekonge Integral Ecological Reserve is found in Cameroon, and covers 26.44 km.

References

Protected areas of Cameroon
Southwest Region (Cameroon)